Joseph Ruzindana (3 June 1943 – 5 June 1994) was a Catholic Bishop of Byumba in Rwanda.

Joseph Ruzindana was born on 3 June 1943 in Rambura.
On 23 July 1972 he was ordained priest of Byumba.
He was appointed Bishop of Byumba on 5 November 1981, and ordained on 17 January 1982.
The bishopric of Byumba was newly formed through a division of the diocese of Ruhengeri.

During the Rwandan genocide, Ruzindana was killed on 5 June 1994 by soldiers of the Rwandan Patriotic Front (RPF),
along with Vincent Nsengiyumva, Archbishop of Kigali, Thaddée Nsengiyumva, Bishop of Kabgayi, nine priests, a senior priest of the Josephite Brothers, and a child.
The soldiers who killed them were their guards at Gakurazo, near the Kabgayi church center.

References
Citations

Sources

1943 births
1994 deaths
People from Nyabihu District
Hutu people
20th-century Roman Catholic bishops in Rwanda
People of the Rwandan genocide
Rwandan murder victims
Rwandan Roman Catholic bishops
Roman Catholic bishops of Byumba